Ussher is a surname. Notable people with the surname include:

 Arland Ussher (1899–1980), English and Irish academic, essayist and translator
 Ambrose Ussher (c. 1582–1629), Church of Ireland rector and biblical scholar, brother of James Ussher
 Beverley Ussher (1868–1908), Australian residential architect
 Elizabeth Tyrrell (née Ussher) (1619–1693), daughter of James Ussher
 Henry Ussher (d. 1613), Irish archbishop, nephew of John Ussher, uncle of James Ussher
 Henry Ussher (astronomer) (1741–1790), Irish astronomer
 Herbert Taylor Ussher (1836–1880), Governor of Tobago 1872-1875
 James Ussher (1581–1656), Irish archbishop and biblical scholar, nephew of Henry Ussher, cousin of Robert Ussher
 Jane Ussher (born 1953), New Zealand photographer
 John (Seón) Ussher (died 1600), Irish customs officer, publisher of the first printed Irish book
 John Ussher (died 1741), Irish MP
 John Ussher (1703–1749), Irish MP, his nephew
 Johnny Ussher (1830–1879), Canadian frontiersman
 Kitty Ussher (born 1971), British Labour Member of Parliament
 Richard J. Ussher (1841–1913), Irish ornithologist
 Robert Ussher (1592–1642), Irish bishop and Irish language promoter, son of Henry Ussher, cousin of James Ussher
 St George Ussher (d. 1775), later St George St George, 1st Baron Saint George
 Thomas Ussher (1779–1848), Anglo-Irish navy officer
 William Augustus Edmond Ussher (1849–1920), British geologist

See also
 Usher (disambiguation)